Rathkeidae is a family of cnidarians belonging to the order Anthoathecata.

Genera:
 Allorathkea Schmidt, 1972
 Lizzia Forbes, 1846
 Podocorynoides Schuchert, 2007
 Rathkea Brandt, 1837

References

 
Filifera
Cnidarian families